Mansour Haghighatpour (born 1959) is an Iranian politician.

Haghighatpour was born in Tehran to parents from Ardabil.  He is a member of the 9th Islamic Consultative Assembly from the electorate of Ardabil, Nir, Namin and Sareyn with Mostafa Afzalifard and Kamaladin Pirmoazzen. Haghighatpour won with 103,268 (40.29%) votes.

He was head of course Assembly representatives North-West of Iran. also he is member of commission of scrutiny Joint Comprehensive Plan of Action in parliament.

He reportedly served in the Quds Force.

References

People from Ardabil
People from Tehran
Deputies of Ardabil, Nir, Namin and Sareyn
Living people
1959 births
University of Tehran alumni
Members of the 9th Islamic Consultative Assembly
Governors of Ardabil Province
Followers of Wilayat fraction members
Front of Islamic Revolution Stability politicians
Islamic Revolutionary Guard Corps brigadier generals
Quds Force personnel